Daniel Pavlović (born 22 April 1988) is a Bosnian professional footballer who plays as a left back for Swiss club Basel U21 on loan from Chiasso.

Club career
Pavlović started playing professionally for SC Freiburg II and spent his early career playing in lower league teams, like FC Schaffhausen and 1. FC Kaiserslautern, up until 2010, when he signed for Grasshopper. Pavlović made a name for himself playing for most successful Swiss club, staying there for five seasons, being the team captain in the last one.

He was signed on one-year loan deal by newly promoted Serie A club Frosinone in the summer of 2015.

In July 2016, Pavlović signed a two-year deal with Sampdoria.

On 31 August 2017, Pavlović joined Crotone on a loan deal. After the loan deal in June 2018 ended, he went back to Sampdoria but the next day left the club after his contract had expired.

On 21 March 2019, Pavlović signed with Serie B club Perugia until 30 June 2019, with an option for an extension for another two seasons.

On 18 July 2022, Pavlović was loaned by Basel for their Under-21 squad that plays in the third-tier Swiss Promotion League.

International career
Pavlović represented Switzerland, country of his birth, on various youth levels. However, he decided to represent Bosnia and Herzegovina on senior level, and got FIFA approval in December 2016.

On 25 March 2017, Pavlović made his senior international debut for Bosnia and Herzegovina in a convincing 5–0 win over Gibraltar.

Career statistics

Club

International

Honours

1. FC Kaiserslautern
2. Bundesliga: 2009–10

Grasshopper
Swiss Cup: 2012–13

References

External links

1988 births
Living people
People from Rorschach, Switzerland
Swiss people of Bosnia and Herzegovina descent
Citizens of Bosnia and Herzegovina through descent
Swiss people of Croatian descent
Association football fullbacks
Swiss men's footballers
Switzerland youth international footballers
Switzerland under-21 international footballers
Bosnia and Herzegovina footballers
Bosnia and Herzegovina international footballers
SC Freiburg II players
FC Schaffhausen players
1. FC Kaiserslautern players
Grasshopper Club Zürich players
Frosinone Calcio players
U.C. Sampdoria players
F.C. Crotone players
A.C. Perugia Calcio players
FC Lugano players
FC Chiasso players
Swiss Challenge League players
Regionalliga players
2. Bundesliga players
Swiss Super League players
Serie A players
Serie B players
Swiss Promotion League players
Swiss expatriate footballers
Bosnia and Herzegovina expatriate footballers
Expatriate footballers in Germany
Swiss expatriate sportspeople in Germany
Bosnia and Herzegovina expatriate sportspeople in Germany
Expatriate footballers in Italy
Bosnia and Herzegovina expatriate sportspeople in Italy
Swiss expatriate sportspeople in Italy
Sportspeople from the canton of St. Gallen